Aleu is a commune in the Ariège department in the Occitanie region of southwestern France.

The inhabitants of the commune are known as Aleudiens or Aleudiennes

Geography

Aleu is located some 10 km south-east of Saint-Girons and 30 km west by south-west of Foix. It can be accessed by the D618 road coming from the west and following the northern border of the commune continuing to Biert in the east. The only access to the village by vehicle is by a small mountain road branching from the D618 at Castet d'Aleu. There is a small unsealed airstrip north-east of the village at approx 1000m altitude. The commune is very rugged with extensive forests. Apart from the village, there are numerous hamlets: Castet d'Aleu, Galas d'en Bas and Galas d'en Haut, La Trappe, La Bordasse, Biech, Pinsou, La Rouere and Fontale.

The Ruisseau d'Aleu rises in the south of the commune and flows north through the centre of the commune and the village gathering many tributaries and continues to join the Arac which forms the entire northern border of the commune. The Ruisseau de Loule forms most of the eastern border and also flows into the Arac. In the west the Ruisseau de Regude forms most of the border and flows north-west to join the Arac north-west of the commune.

Neighbouring communes and villages

History
The commune of Aleu was created in the French Revolution superseding the Community of Aleu which was detached in 1776 from that of Soulan.

Administration

List of successive mayors

Population

Sites and monuments

Joubac, a small peak just above Aleu, has an altiport with a view of all the surrounding mountains and the Mont Valier mountain chain
The Church of Saint Benedict contains a 12th-century font  which is registered as an historical object.
Church of Saint Roch and Saint Germaine at Castet d'Aleu (windows from the 19th century)
Castelet of Castet at Aleu dating from the 12th or 13th century

Notable people linked to the commune
Léopold Galy, born in Aleu on 12 March 1908 and died at Toulouse on 17 February 2001, was a French aviator and test pilot

See also
Communes of the Ariège department
Cantons of the Ariège department
Arrondissements of the Ariège department

References

External links
Aleu on the old IGN website 
Aleu on Géoportail, National Geographic Institute (IGN) website 
Aleu on the 1750 Cassini Map

Communes of Ariège (department)